The 1924 Burnley by-election was held on 28 February 1924.  The by-election was held due to the death of the incumbent Labour MP, Dan Irving.  It was won by the Labour candidate Arthur Henderson who had led the party. Henderson had lost his Newcastle East seat at last year's general election, but had been appointed Home Secretary in the Labour Government which had taken office in January.

References

Burnley by-election
Burnley by-election
Burnley by-election
1920s in Lancashire
Politics of Burnley
By-elections to the Parliament of the United Kingdom in Lancashire constituencies